The triens (plural trientes) was an Ancient Roman bronze coin produced during the Roman Republic valued at one-third of an as (4 unciae). The most common design for the triens featured the bust of Minerva and four pellets (indicating four unciae) on the obverse and the prow of a galley on the reverse. It was not a common denomination and was last struck c. 89 BC.

Later, in Frankish Gaul, the term "triens" was often used for the tremissis, since both terms meant "a third".

See also
Roman currency

References

Coins of ancient Rome